Hiltaba Nature Reserve is located in the north of the Eyre Peninsula on the western edge of the Gawler Ranges, South Australia. It is situated on a former pastoral lease known as Hiltaba, or Hiltaba Station, that had operated as a sheep station. It is owned by the Nature Foundation, who purchased the property in 2012.

History 

The traditional owners of the Gawler Ranges are the Barngarla, Kokatha and Wirangu peoples, who have inhabited the area for at least 30,000 years and are known collectively as the Gawler Ranges Aboriginal People. The tribal land of a man called "Whipstick Billy", who was "one of the last Gawler Ranges natives" still alive by around 1910, was said to have been centred on Hiltaba.

Around 1844, John Charles Darke explored the region, using an ox-drawn cart (known as a bullock dray in Australia). Around 1857, Aboriginal guides led a government-equipped party with pack horses, headed by Stephen Hack from Streaky Bay, through the Gawler Ranges, on a search for sheep-farming land. Hiltaba was one of the first three pastoral leases taken up in the area in the 1860s, along with Yardea and Paney Station, all with names of Aboriginal origin. Hiltaba was also referred to as "Hiltruby" and "Hiltaby", and it is not known which comes closest to the Aboriginal name for the area. James Hiern took up the Hiltaba lease in 1868, who later sold it to his business partner Anton Schlinke, who had migrated from Prussia in the 1840s. Schlinke, after adding many improvements to the property, was not able to farm it successfully owing to rabbits and dingoes (rabbits provided food for the dingoes, leading to large numbers, so both became pests), so gave the lease back to the Crown, after which it remained unoccupied for years. Much later, his son William took over the lease.

Over the years, the boundaries, owners and managers changed, and was sometimes only used for winter pasture, leaving Yardea as the only permanent station west of the ranges. The Fitzgerald brothers, who lived there from around 1892 to 1912, built the dam and the original (now roofless) home. In 1918, Carl Hermann Nitschke bought the lease, and it was passed down through his family. His son, test cricketer Homesdale Nitschke (aka "Jack" or "Slinger"), owned the property for some time. He built the present homestead in 1936, before his marriage.

Cattle were introduced from time to time, but numbers of both cattle and sheep fluctuated. In 1918, there were about 2,000 sheep and a few hundred cattle; by 1939, there were 11,500 sheep. Cattle were removed from the property in the 1960s. Rabbits, dingoes, kangaroos, feral goats , irregular rainfall and saline water all contributed to making it hard to make a good living out of farming on the property.

The MacLachlan family purchased Hiltaba in 1986, in 1995 transferring it to Janet Angas (née MacLachlan) and her husband Alastair.

After the Millennium drought caused the end of using the property as a sheep station, it was destocked. The SA Department of Environment, Water & Natural Resources (DEWNR) noticed that the property was for sale around 2011, and encouraged Nature Foundation to acquire it. Hiltaba Station was bought by the Nature Foundation in 2012, with the assistance of the Federal Government's Caring for Our Country fund and the Government of South Australia, with the intention of returning the property to its natural state.

All sheep were removed from the area, and by the time of its opening as a reserve (although not yet to the public) on 3 May 2013, around 6500 feral goats had been removed. Workers were continuing to shoot feral cats and lay down bait for foxes. There was a special dedication at the opening ceremony to Damien Pearce, a DEWNR employee who had worked hard to achieve the corridor in the arid lands but died in 2010, before the purchase of the property.

In 2018 two budget bush campgrounds were opened on the property: one at Pretty Point, with only a toilet, no showers, while the one at the Old Shearers Quarters has showers and toilets.

Description 

Hiltaba Nature Reserve adjoins the Gawler Ranges National Park, which is managed by the South Australian Department for Environment & Water, in consultation with the traditional owners. The area is part of the northern Eyre Peninsula Not far from its western border lies the Yellabinna Regional Reserve.

The  property includes unique and significant geological formations composed of granite, and diverse grass and woodland habitat for a diverse range of native flora and fauna. Scientific surveys have discovered  21 new species of spiders, 13 species of snails, and a number of pythons, monitor lizards and various plants found nowhere else on the planet.

Rock holes in the granite, which gather rain water and are of Aboriginal cultural significance, are maintained on the property.

The foundation has created driving and walking tracks, as well as fireplaces and accessible fuel for campers. The property remains a pastoral lease, and adjoining landholders help to manage issues like stray stock, dingoes and feral goats.

Apart from the substantial bungalow built by Slinger Nitschke, there are also several other structures on the property:
 The woolshed, which has been substantially restored by volunteers
 Shearers' Quarters, now used as accommodation for guests
 Several dams
 The original home built by the Fitzgerald brothers
 The "Governes's cottage
 A grave of an 11-month-old infant who lived on Kondoolka Station to the north-west, who died on the way to Streaky Bay hospital by horse and cart

Flora and fauna 
Several species of both plants and animals identified on a "Bush Blitz" survey in 2012 are rare species, endangered species or vulnerable species, according to the National Parks and Wildlife Act 1972 (SA). The acacia shrub lands, casuarina woodlands, mallee forest and tussock grasslands provide habitat for over 40 state-listed species and nine species listed by the Government of Australia (under the Environment Protection and Biodiversity Conservation Act 1999).

Notable species include:
Fauna
 Slender-billed thornbill
 Short-tailed grasswren
 Yellow-footed rock-wallaby

Flora
 Delicate podolepis (copper-wire daisy)
 Desert greenhood orchid
 Gawler Ranges hop bush
 Gawler Ranges slipper-plant

Other plant species which can be seen on the property include bullock bush, eucalyptus socialis (a type of mallee), lobe-leaf hop bush (Dodonaea lobulata), paperbark, black oak, native apricot and western myall.

There are many species of kangaroos and wallabies, as well as southern hairy-nosed wombats, echidnas, dunnarts, and varioust types of lizards, including Gould's goannas and black-headed monitors, and snakes. Bird species include the emu, mulga parrot, and Port Lincoln parrot.

Geological significance 

The geology of the area is highly complex and of great significance. It was once part of the large earlier continent that was joined to Adélie Land, now in Antarctica. The Gawler Ranges are part of the geologically significant Gawler Craton, which was  begun to be formed nearly 3 billion years ago, completing is current complex formation around 2 billion years ago. The Craton was subsequently subjected to two huge events: the first being a succession of huge volcanic eruptions, around 1592 million years ago (the Gawler Range Volcanics, or GRV), and the second about a billion years later, when an immense meteorite or asteroid crashed into the site of the current Lake Acraman, just north of the reserve.

The Gawler Range Volcanics and the Hiltaba Suite granite form a Mesoproterozoic SLIP, or Silicic-dominated Large Igneous Province, covering a large area in the central Gawler Craton. There are only a few recognised SLIPs in the world, with this one known as the Gawler SLIP.

Mount Hiltaba ( is one of the highest peaks in the Gawler Ranges, and has a large cairn at the top. There are also cairns on Mount St Mungo and Mount Friday, being erected as trig points.

In 2015 to 2016 detailed geological mapping was undertaken as part of mineral exploration, as the property lies in the Iron Oxide Copper Gold province of the GRV.

Kids on Country 
The Nature Foundation runs the "Kids on Country" program at both Hiltaba and the Witchelina Nature Reserve. In the third camp of the programme at Hiltaba in 2018, 16 students aged from 12 to 14 years old from Ceduna spent a week on the property, where they helped to improve the property as a nature reserve, while at the same time learning about Aboriginal peoples' unique connection to country, along with STEM learning. The aim was to help the children to connect the Aboriginal, palaeontological, and geological stories of the area. The students helped to prepare bush tucker such as kangaroo tail and wombat meat, and to clean the rock holes.

Educators, Aboriginal elders and Indigenous rangers are involved in the programme.

For visitors 
The park is open to day and staying visitors between 1 April and 31 October. There are two bush campgrounds, and 9 rooms for up to 17 people at the Shearers' Quarters, and two cottages accommodating five people each. There are numerous walking and driving tracks, with the five walks named after the founders and other early supporters of the foundation.

See also 
 List of ranches and stations

References

External links 
 
 Wade, Claire.  (30 Jun 2021), 30 m 20s.

Pastoral leases in South Australia
Stations (Australian agriculture)
Nature reserves in South Australia
2012 establishments in Australia